Amasa Leland Stanford (March 9, 1824June 21, 1893) was an American industrialist and politician. A member of the Republican Party, he served as the 8th governor of California from 1862 to 1863 and represented California in the United States Senate from 1885 until his death in 1893. He and his wife Jane were also the founders of Stanford University, which they named after their late son. Prior to his political career, Stanford was a successful merchant and wholesaler who built his business empire after migrating to California during the Gold Rush. As president of the Central Pacific Railroad and later the Southern Pacific from 1885 to 1890, he held tremendous power in the region and a lasting impact on California. Stanford is widely considered a robber baron.

Early life and career
Leland Stanford was born in 1824 in what was then Watervliet, New York (now the Town of Colonie). He was one of eight children of Josiah and Elizabeth Phillips Stanford. Among his siblings were New York State Senator Charles Stanford (1819–1885) and Australian businessman and spiritualist Thomas Welton Stanford (1832–1918). His immigrant ancestor, Thomas Stanford, settled in Charlestown, Massachusetts, in the 17th century. Later ancestors settled in the eastern Mohawk Valley of central New York about 1720.

Stanford's father was a farmer of some means. Stanford was raised on family farms in the Lisha Kill and Roessleville (after 1836) areas of Watervliet. The family home in Roessleville was called Elm Grove. The Elm Grove home was razed in the 1940s. Stanford attended the common school until 1836 and was tutored at home until 1839. He attended Clinton Liberal Institute, in Clinton, New York, and studied law at Cazenovia Seminary in Cazenovia, New York, in 1841 to 1845. In 1845, he entered the law office of Wheaton, Doolittle, and Hadley in Albany.

After being admitted to the bar in 1848, Stanford moved with many other settlers to Port Washington, Wisconsin, where he began a law practice with Wesley Pierce. His father presented him with a law library said to be the finest north of Milwaukee. In 1850, Stanford was nominated by the Whig Party as Washington County, Wisconsin district attorney.

Marriage and family
On September 30, 1850, Stanford married Jane Elizabeth Lathrop in Albany, New York. She was the daughter of Dyer Lathrop, a merchant of that city, and Jane Anne (Shields) Lathrop. The couple did not have any children for years, until their only child, a son, Leland DeWitt Stanford, was born in 1868 when his father was forty-four.

Businesses

In 1852, having lost his law library and other property to a fire, Stanford followed his five brothers to California during the California Gold Rush. His wife, Jane, returned temporarily to Albany and her family. He went into business with his brothers and became the keeper of a general store for miners at Michigan City, California, later the name changed to Michigan Bluff in Placer County; later he had a wholesale house. He served as a justice of the peace and helped organize the Sacramento Library Association, which later became the Sacramento Public Library. In 1855, he returned to Albany to join his wife, but found the pace of Eastern life too slow after the excitement of developing California.

 In 1856, he and Jane moved to Sacramento, where he engaged in mercantile pursuits on a large scale. He was one of the four merchants known popularly as "The Big Four" (or among themselves as "the Associates"), who were the key investors in Chief Engineer Theodore Dehone Judah's plan for the Central Pacific Railroad. The five of them incorporated it on June 28, 1861, and Stanford was elected as its president. The other three associates were Charles Crocker, Mark Hopkins, and Collis P. Huntington. 
The Central Pacific's first locomotive, named Gov. Stanford in his honor, is preserved on static display at the California State Railroad Museum, in Sacramento.

Stanford ran unsuccessfully for governor of California in 1859. He was nominated again in 1861 and won the election. Due to the Great Flood of 1862, he had to row to his inauguration in a rowboat. He served one term, then limited to two years. 

In May 1868, he joined Lloyd Tevis, Darius Ogden Mills, H.D. Bacon, Hopkins, and Crocker in forming the Pacific Union Express Company. It merged in 1870 with Wells Fargo and Company. Stanford was a director of Wells Fargo and Company from 1870 to January 1884. After a brief retirement from the board, he served again from February 1884 to his death in June 1893.

Also in May 1868, he started the Pacific Mutual Life Insurance Company (now Pacific Life) and served as its first president from 1868 to 1876.

While the Central Pacific was under construction, Stanford and his associates in 1868 acquired control of the Southern Pacific Railroad. Stanford was elected president of the Southern Pacific, a post he held until 1890 (except for a brief period in 1869–1870 when Tevis was acting president) when he was ousted by Collis Huntington.

As head of the railroad company that built the western portion of the "First Transcontinental Railroad" from Sacramento eastward over the Sierra Nevada mountains in California to Nevada and Utah, Stanford presided at the ceremonial driving of "Last Spike" in Promontory, Utah on May 10, 1869. The grade of the CPRR met that of the Union Pacific Railroad, which had been built westward from its eastern terminus at Council Bluffs, Iowa/Omaha, Nebraska. He was even given the honor of driving the final spike.

Stanford moved with his family from Sacramento to San Francisco in 1874, where he assumed presidency of the Occidental and Oriental Steamship Company, the steamship line to Japan and China associated with the Central Pacific.

The Southern Pacific Company was organized in 1884 as a holding company for the Central Pacific-Southern Pacific system. Stanford was president of the Southern Pacific Company from 1885 until 1890 when he was forced out of that post (as well as the presidency of the Southern Pacific Railroad) by Collis Huntington, the company's ranking vice president and the corporate directorate. That was thought to be retaliation for Stanford's election to the US Senate in 1885 over Huntington's friend, Aaron A. Sargent.

Stanford was elected chairman of the Southern Pacific Railroad's executive committee in 1890, and he held this post and the presidency of the Central Pacific Railroad until his death.

He is widely considered a robber baron.

Other interests

In Santa Clara County, he founded his Palo Alto Stock Farm. He bred Standardbred horses to be raced as trotters, including his chief sire, Electioneer (sired by Hambletonian) and his winning offspring: Arion, Sunol, Palo Alto, and Chimes (out of Stanford's best known dam Beautiful Bells); and Thoroughbreds for flat racing. In 1872, Stanford commissioned the photographer Eadweard Muybridge to undertake scientific studies of the gaits of horses at a trot and gallop at the Agricultural Park race track in Sacramento. Images of the horses' feet were captured there, later moving to his Palo Alto Stock Farm. He wanted to determine if the horses ever had all four feet off the ground at the same time. The result was the proto-film Sallie Gardner at a Gallop (1878). As the Palo Alto breeding farm was later developed into the Stanford University, the university was nicknamed "The Farm."

Residences

The Stanfords retained ownership of their mansion in Sacramento, where their only son was born in 1868. Now the Leland Stanford Mansion State Historic Park, the house museum is also used for California state social occasions. The Stanfords' home in San Francisco's Nob Hill district was destroyed in the 1906 San Francisco earthquake; the site is now occupied by the Stanford Court Hotel. The Stanford residence at the Palo Alto Stock Farm became a convalescent home for children in 1919 (the forerunner of the Lucille Packard Children's Hospital) and was torn down in 1965.

Politics

Stanford was politically active and became a leading member of the Republican Party. In 1856, he met with other Whig politicians in Sacramento on April 30 to organize the California Republican Party at its first state convention. He was chosen as a delegate to the Republican Party convention that selected US presidential electors in both 1856 and 1860. Stanford was defeated in his 1857 bid for California state treasurer, and his 1859 bid for the office of governor of California. In 1860, he was named a delegate to the Republican National Convention in Chicago, but did not attend. He was elected governor in a second campaign in 1861.

Governor of California

He was the eighth Governor of California, serving from January 1862 to December 1863, and the first Republican governor. Due to the Great Flood of 1862, the governor was said to have needed to row in a boat to his own inauguration. A large, slow-speaking man who always read from a prepared text, he impressed his listeners as being more sincere than a glib, extemporaneous speaker.

During his gubernatorial tenure, he cut the state's debt in half and advocated for the conservation of forests. He also oversaw the establishment of the California's first state normal school in San Jose, later to become San Jose State University. Following Stanford's governorship, the term of office changed from two years to four years, in line with legislation passed during his time in office.

Native Americans
The ongoing eradication of the Native Americans living in California continued under his administration. He did sign into law an act reversing part of the 1850 Act for the Government and Protection of Indians that allowed the enslavement of Native Americans.  However, he also continued the prosecution of the Bald Hills War in Northern California.

Chinese immigrants
The gold strike in California had brought a large influx of newcomers into the territory, including Chinese immigrants, who faced persecution. Anti-Chinese sentiment became a political issue over time. In a message to the legislature in January 1862, Governor Stanford said:

Stanford was initially acclaimed for such statements, but lost support when it was revealed that his Central Pacific Railroad was also importing Chinese workers to construct the railroad.

United States Senator

Later, he served in the United States Senate from 1885 until his death in 1893. He was president and director of the Central Pacific Railroad the entire time he sat in the Senate. He authored several Senate bills that advanced ideas advocated by the People's Party: a bill to foster the creation of worker-owned cooperatives, and a bill to allow the issuance of currency backed by land value instead of only the gold standard. Neither bill made it out of committee. In Washington, DC, he had a residence on Farragut Square near the home of Baron Karl von Struve, Russian minister to the US.

Stanford University

With his wife Jane, Stanford founded Leland Stanford Junior University as a memorial for their only child, Leland Stanford Jr., who died as a teenager of typhoid fever in Florence, Italy, in 1884 while on a trip to Europe. The university was established by March 9, 1885, Endowment Act of the California Assembly and Senate, and the Grant of Endowment from Leland and Jane Stanford signed at the first meeting of the board of trustees on November 14, 1885.

The Stanfords donated approximately 40 million United States Dollars (equivalent to $ today) to develop the university, which held its opening exercises on October 1, 1891, and was intended for agricultural studies. Its first student, admitted to Encina Hall that day, was Herbert Hoover, who went on to become the 31st US president. The wealth of the Stanford family during the late 19th century is estimated at $50 million (equivalent to $ today).

Worker co-operatives
Stanford had ideas of Stanford University employee ownership for more than thirty years before giving them expression in his plans for the university, proposals as a Senator, and in interviews with the news media.

Personal life
Stanford was an active Freemason from 1850 to 1855, joining the Prometheus Lodge No. 17 in Port Washington, Wisconsin. After moving west, he became a member of the Michigan City Lodge No. 47 in Michigan Bluff, California. He was also a member of the Independent Order of Odd Fellows in California.

Long-suffering from locomotor ataxia, Leland Stanford died of heart failure at home in Palo Alto, California, on June 21, 1893. He was buried in the family mausoleum on the Stanford campus. Jane Stanford died in 1905 after being poisoned with strychnine.

Legacy and honors
In 1862 California volunteer troops re-building a military post at the confluence of the San Pedro River and Aravaipa Creek in Arizona Territory named the post Fort Stanford after the governor.  However, the post later reverted to its former name, Fort Breckenridge, and in 1866 became Camp Grant.
Central Pacific locomotives named for Stanford were:
Gov. Stanford, a 4-4-0 locomotive built in 1863 by the Norris Locomotive Works in Philadelphia and brought to San Francisco by sailing vessel. This engine is preserved at the California State Railroad Museum in Sacramento.
El Gobernador, a 4-10-0 locomotive built in the Central Pacific shops in Sacramento in 1884. Found to be disappointing in its performance as a freight hauler, it was scrapped in July 1894.
The Stanford Memorial Church on the university campus is dedicated to him.
2008, Stanford was inducted into The California Museum for History, Women and the Arts, California Hall of Fame. A relative, Tom Stanford, accepted the honors on his behalf.
 Mount Stanford, located in California's Sierra Nevada, is named in his honor.

In fiction

Leland Stanford and Stanford University, fictionalized as Grover Linden and Linden University respectively, feature in Michael Nava, Lay Your Sleeping Head (2016), a mystery novel, the plot of which revolves in part around the fate of the Linden, i.e., Stanford, fortune.

See also
List of United States Congress members who died in office (1790–1899)
List of governors of California

References

External links

 Governor Leland Stanford biography at the California State Library
 
Penny Postcards: Leland Stanford's store: Michigan Bluff, California
 

1824 births
1893 deaths
19th-century American politicians
19th-century American railroad executives
American railway entrepreneurs
American people of English descent
American philanthropists
American racehorse owners and breeders
American winemakers
Anti-Chinese sentiment in the United States
Businesspeople from California
Businesspeople from New York (state)
California Republicans
Cazenovia College alumni
American cooperative organizers
Governors of California
New York (state) lawyers
Nob Hill, San Francisco
People from Watervliet, New York
People from Port Washington, Wisconsin
People from Palo Alto, California
People of California in the American Civil War
Philanthropists from California
Philanthropists from New York (state)
Republican Party governors of California
Republican Party United States senators from California
Southern Pacific Railroad people
Stanford University people
University and college founders
University of California regents
Union (American Civil War) state governors
Wells Fargo
Wisconsin lawyers
Wisconsin Whigs